Etienne van Empel (born 14 April 1994) is a Dutch cyclist, who currently rides for UCI ProTeam . In October 2020, he was named in the startlist for the 2020 Giro d'Italia.

Major results
2016
 9th Druivenkoers Overijse
2017
 5th Ronde van Limburg
2019
 3rd Overall Tour de Taiwan

Grand Tour general classification results timeline

References

External links

 
 
 

1994 births
Living people
Dutch male cyclists
People from Geldermalsen
Cyclists from Gelderland
21st-century Dutch people